Veria Stadium is a multi-purpose stadium in Veria, Greece. It is used for football matches, and is the home stadium of NFC Veria. It was built in 1925 by members of music and gymnastics association Megas Alexandros. The stadium holds about 7,000. Record attendance is 10,309 for a game between Veria and Panathinaikos in 1970. However, during a game between Veria FC and PAOK FC there were about 12,000 fans, but most of them entered the stadium without a ticket. The stadium formerly held track races too but after the renovations in 2005 and 2007 the space for track runners was removed.

Renovation
During 1997, Veria F.C. in co-operation with Municipality of Veria installed a roof at the west stand while, in 1998 an electronic scoreboard was installed. Again, in 2005 a lighting system was installed while the stadium capacity was greatly reduced due to the installation of seats to approximately 5,300. Although, in 2007 administration board of Veria & the city's mayor agreed to the construction of a north and a south stand which increased the stadium capacity to 7,000. During the team's comeback to the Superleague in 2012 Veria applied some improvements to the stadium in order to be qualified to host the championship matches.
 
In 2013, Veria F.C. announced another renovation in the stadium. Since the beginning of the season due to security reasons the stands were upgraded as security rails were installed. Also due to damaged drainage system and an almost destroyed football field, on September 16, 2013, Veria announced the replacement of current drainage system and the reinstallation of a new football field. The replacement was expected to be complete by October 20, 2013. Veria F.C. was expected to use its stadium again in the local derby against Aris in October 20. Also there are plans of another expansion in the near future while soon the electronic ticket will be available in Veria Stadium as well. On October 18, 2013 Veria announced that the renovation of stadium was over and the stadium was ready to host again Veria's fixtures in Superleague Greece. Except the pitch's replacement the stadium was painted in blue-crimson colours while new goalposts were installed. Last but not least the locker rooms and the stadium's entrance were improved too. So that the stadium is able to host International matches.

Venues
In summer of 2015 Veria and her stadium will host in Greece along with Katerini and Larissa the 2015 UEFA European Under-19 Championship. Also every year, during the summer season there are plenty of music concerts taking place. On 17 September 2014 Veria Stadium held its first ever international match between Greece and Albania as part of 2015 FIFA Women's World Cup European qualification round. During November 2014, an international friendly tournament was held at Veria Stadium.

Most Receipts

International Matches

Gallery

References

External links
Veria Stadium website

Veria F.C.
Football venues in Greece
Buildings and structures in Veria
Multi-purpose stadiums in Greece
Sports venues in Central Macedonia